Daguinaspis is an early  Cambrian trilobite genus found in Morocco. Like the closely related Choubertella and Wolynaspis, but unlike any other Fallotaspidoidea, it lacks genal spines.

Distribution  
Cambrian of the Anti-Atlas, Morocco, 30.4° N, 8.8° W  (Daguinaspis trilobite zone, Tazemmourt Section and Tiout Section. Amouslek Formation, Middle Atdabanian (520.0 - 516.0 Ma) )

Ecology 
Daguinaspis occurs together with the trilobites Marsaisia robauxi and Resserops bourgini, and the brachiopod Brevipelta chouberti  (Tazemmourt), and also with the problematic Microschedia amphitrite (Tiout).

References 

Fossils of Morocco
Cambrian trilobites
Fallotaspidoidea